Tech Trust (formerly Charity Technology Trust and Technology Trust) is a UK-based charity and social enterprise that aims to help other charities and not-for-profit organisations increase their impact through more effective use of Information Technology.

Tech Trust provides a software donation programme, an email marketing service, a payment gateway service, and a foreign exchange currency service. They currently work with more than 30,000 charities and have saved the charity sector over £200 million through discounted software procurement and other programmes.

History

Peter Sweatman founded Tech Trust (known then as Charity Technology Trust) to bring together key players in the charity, business and technology sectors. Among the initial supporters of Charity Technology Trust (CTT) were Charles Dunstone, Peter Wheeler, Lord Joel Joffe, Tessa Baring and Michael Young, Baron Young of Dartington.

The charity’s first initiative was CTT Raffles, which provided online raffling technology to UK charities. The CTT Raffles platform was supported by James Redhead, and offered a tailored online raffling engine, along with data capture, collation and processing of entries and marketing support. It launched in May 2001 with the support of Oxfam, Guide Dogs for the Blind, Barnardo's, PDSA and the National Trust.

In 2003, the charity branched out into e-communications, offering a charity email service that allowed leading charities to make a number of email marketing campaigns throughout the year. In 2008, they partnered with dotmailer to offer a new, low-cost email marketing system to charities and not-for-profits. The service was known as CTTMail, but has since been rebranded to tt-mail.

In 2006, Charity Technology Trust joined the global software donation programme run by TechSoup to deliver Microsoft’s donation programme in the UK. The scheme is open to all UK registered charities, who pay an administration fee, usually of between 4 and 8 per cent of retail price. CTT was already providing Cisco donated products through an online shop on its CTXchange website (now tt-exchange). Since then, the programme has expanded to include a number of different digital technology partners.

In October 2013, Charity Technology Trust (CTT) changed its name to Technology Trust. In October 2017, the name was changed again to Tech Trust. The registered charity name and company name has remained the same.

The last Chief Executive, Richard Craig, stepped down in January 2018. The current Chair is Charles Mindenhall.

Awards

In August 2012, the charity was shortlisted for two Charity Times Awards. Their partnership with Microsoft was selected for the Corporate National Partnership Champion category, and the partnership between CTT, SCIE (Social Care Institute for Excellence) and Lasa on the Get Connected project has also been recognised, with the project being named as one of six finalists in the Cross-Sector Partnership of the Year category.

Services

tt-exchange – This is a software donation programme for UK charities. Since 2007, it has saved over 23,000 UK charities £175m in software procurement by providing savings up to 96%.
tt-mail – This is an email marketing platform designed for charities, and run in collaboration with DotMailer. Charities send around 40m emails per year through the platform, improving their engagement and donations.
tt-terminal – This is payments processing service for charities. Between 2004 and 2016, around £300m of online, telephone and mail donations were processed by over 2,000 charities using the platform.
tt-forex – This provides currency transfer and exchange services. Charges are up to 90% lower than the high street banks, and the platform offers a greater level of visibility and control over transactions.

References

External links
Tech Trust Official site.
tt-exchange Programme Official site.
tt-mail Programme Official site.

Bibliography
Microsoft Press Release 8 May 2012 - Donating software to UK charities to improve their community impact
Nominet Trust - Our top tips on what charities' can do in the online space
Guardian Voluntary Sector Network, 11 May 2012 - Are you preparing to vacate the office during the Olympics?

Charities based in London